Delta-1-pyrroline-5-carboxylate dehydrogenase, mitochondrial is an enzyme that in humans is encoded by the ALDH4A1 gene.

This protein belongs to the aldehyde dehydrogenase family of proteins. This enzyme is a mitochondrial matrix NAD-dependent dehydrogenase that catalyzes the second step of the proline degradation pathway, converting pyrroline-5-carboxylate to glutamate. Deficiency of this enzyme is associated with type II hyperprolinemia, an autosomal recessive disorder characterized by accumulation of delta-1-pyrroline-5-carboxylate (P5C) and proline. Two transcript variants encoding the same protein have been identified for this gene.

References

External links
 
 PDBe-KB provides an overview of all the structure information available in the PDB for Human Delta-1-pyrroline-5-carboxylate dehydrogenase, mitochondrial (ALDH4A1)
 PDBe-KB provides an overview of all the structure information available in the PDB for Mouse Delta-1-pyrroline-5-carboxylate dehydrogenase, mitochondrial (ALDH4A1)

Further reading